Tabassum (1944–2022) was an Indian actress and talk show host.

Tabassum may also refer to:

 Tabassum or Ghulam Mustafa Tabassum (1899–1978), Pakistani poet
 Tabassum (name), includes a list of people with the given name and surname

See also